Lowell House may refer to:

 Lowell House, undergraduate residential house at Harvard University, Cambridge, Massachusetts, US
 Lowell House (publisher), publishing company based in Los Angeles, California, US
 Lowell House (New Haven, Connecticut), settlement house based in New Haven, Connecticut, US
 Lowell Damon House, historic house in Wauwatosa, Wisconsin, US